"In the Summer of His Years" is a 1963 pop song with lyrics written by Herb Kretzmer and music by David Lee. Kretzmer and Lee composed the song as a tribute hours after learning that President John F. Kennedy was assassinated on November 22, 1963 in Dallas, Texas.

"In the Summer of His Years" was first performed by English singer Millicent Martin during a tribute broadcast to President Kennedy that aired on the BBC on 23 November 1963. The show on which the song was introduced was a special broadcast of the BBC's satirical weekly news programme That Was the Week That Was; after the news of the assassination broke, the producers of the show discarded the week's planned scripts and sketches and decided to refashion that week's show as a somber and respectful tribute to President Kennedy. NBC later rebroadcast the programme. A soundtrack to the That Was the Week That Was broadcast was also released in the United States on Decca Records.

Other versions
After the song was performed on the BBC, several other artists recorded and released the song as a single. Mahalia Jackson recorded the song on November 29, 1963 which was released by Columbia Records; Connie Francis recorded her own version on December 2, 1963, followed by its immediate release on MGM. The arrangement was provided by Claus Ogerman who also conducted the recording. Other artists to record the song included Kate Smith (for RCA Victor), Toni Arden (for Decca Records, Bobby Rydell, and Hettie Palance (for Palance Records).

Of the various versions of "In the Summer of His Years," only Francis' and Martin's recordings achieved enough sales action to chart on Billboard. Martin's single, released on the ABC-Paramount label, "Bubbled Under" the Hot 100 singles chart, peaking at No. 104, and Francis' version was nearly a Top 40 hit, peaking at No. 46. On the Cash Box magazine Top 100 chart, the sales of Francis' and Martin's singles were combined, and the song peaked at No. 31.

However, no version of the song was granted a single release in the U.K., and in the United States, the song, even though recorded by major artists, was refused airplay by many major radio stations. An article in the December 14, 1963, issue of Billboard quoted station managers of several radio stations in New York and Chicago as saying they would not play the song because they felt it would be "in poor taste to capitalize on a such a tragic situation".  Other station managers said they stopped playing the song after initially playing Millicent Martin's version because of apparent lack of listener interest or because they simply thought the song itself was of poor quality.

All the proceeds of Francis' single and her subsequent album of the same name were donated to the family of J. D. Tippit, a policeman who was also fatally shot in Dallas on November 22, 1963. Francis' version of the song is considered one of the earliest charity records.

References

1963 singles
British pop songs
Charity singles
Connie Francis songs
1963 songs
Songs with lyrics by Herbert Kretzmer
MGM Records singles
Columbia Records singles
ABC Records singles
Paramount Records singles
Songs about the assassination of John F. Kennedy